Jatt & Juliet 2 is a 2013 Indian Punjabi romance comedy film directed by Anurag Singh. The film is a sequel to the 2012 blockbuster Jatt & Juliet, however not directly or story-wise. Actors Diljit Dosanjh and Neeru Bajwa reprise their roles from the previous film in the sequel amongst other characters. The film released on 28 June 2013, almost a year after the release of the prequel, and received a positive response at the box office. Jatt & Juliet 2 went on to become the highest-grossing Punjabi film ever, thus beating the record previously held by the first Jatt & Juliet film. Jatt and Juliet 2 will be the first ever Punjabi movie to be released on Blu-ray. 
 The movie was remade in Bengali in 2018 as Inspector Notty K.

Plot
Fateh Singh (Diljit Dosanjh) is a Punjab police constable who desperately wants a promotion. Due to this, he accepts the request of his Deputy Commissioner request backed up by Inspector Singh's (Jaswinder Bhalla) to fly to Canada and convince his daughter, Pooja Singh (Neeru Bajwa), and her mother to come back to India. Fateh assumes that it should be a fairly task. He flies to Canada and upon reaching Vancouver, starts his mission to bring Pooja back but mistakes Pooja's friend working in a beauty salon as Pooja herself, but is dismayed when he finds out that Pooja is actually a "by the books" police officer with the Vancouver Police Department. Fateh, in order to bring her back and to avoid deportation back to India, helps Pooja to convince her mother in getting herself roped with a Caucasian guy in a marriage bond whom Pooja likes. This clashes with his irreverent and unsophisticated personality, but soon the two begin to find themselves drawn to one another.

Cast
 Diljit Dosanjh as Head Constable |Fateh Singh
 Neeru Bajwa as Constable Pooja Singh
 Rana Ranbir as Shampy / Loveoshan Singh
 Jaswinder Bhalla as Inspector Joginder Singh
 B.N. Sharma as Gunoshan Singh Chawla (Shampy Da Daddy)
Devinder Dillon 
 Bharti Singh as Preet / fake pooja
 Jacob Insley	as Chris
 Dolly Mattoo	as Pooja's Mother
 Rana Jung Bahadur as Pakistani taxi driver
 Anita Devgan as Fateh Singh's Mother
 Vijay Tandon as Pooja's Father
 Amrit Billa as Fateh Singh's Father
 Balinder Johal as Pooja's Grandmother
 Moishe Teichman as Wedding Priest
 Jazzy B in Special Appearance
 Jenny Ghotra in Guest Appearance in song Mr. Singh
 Razia Sukhbir

Reception 
The Hindustan Times gave a positive review for Jatt & Juliet 2, praising the film's acting and music, while commenting that "audiences would do well to not compare the film with the original". On 25 October Jatt & Juliet became the first Punjabi Movie made in Punjab, India to have been released in Pakistan. The film has been released in Pakistan by Surya Basic Brothers Distribution and Whitehill productions in association with Yellow Hill Media and Entertainment (Pakistan).

Box office

Jatt & Juliet 2' has emerged the biggest blockbuster of Punjabi cinema. The film has made a box office collections nearing  approx (All India). Jatt & Juliet 2 has broken all records in 12 days of run and established new benchmarks for the industry all over.

Film collected approx - in 1st week. Film dropped by just 30-35% in 2nd weekend and managed further . Film had collected  in 10 days and surpassed previous record of  lifetime of "Jatt & Juliet" by end of 2nd week.

Film finished with  after two weeks and lifetime figure was in the range of - with touching . Film also collected  in rest of India which means worldwide collection stood in excess of  already.

Telugu remake
Telugu Filmmaker Vasu Manthena acquired the rights of Jatt & Juliet 2, to produce it in Telugu cinema.

PTC Punjabi Film Awards 2014

Jatt & Juliet 2 won four awards at the 4th PTC Punjabi Film Awards in 2014.

References

External links
 
 Jatt & juliet 2 on Punjabiportal.com

2013 films
Films scored by Jatinder Shah
2013 romantic comedy films
Films shot in Vancouver
Films shot in India
Indian romantic comedy films
Punjabi films remade in other languages
Punjabi-language Indian films
2010s Punjabi-language films
Fictional portrayals of the Punjab Police (India)
Films directed by Anurag Singh